is a Japanese manga artist and illustrator, whose works include Kamikaze and Riot. He's also an artist of hentai manga, and this influence can be seen even in his non-hentai works like Kamikaze and Daphne in the Brilliant Blue. He worked on XBlade in the magazine Monthly Shōnen Sirius, and then illustrated the manga adaptation of Attack on Titan: Before the Fall, a light novel that acts as a prequel to the Attack on Titan manga series, also serialized at Monthly Shōnen Sirius.

Works

References

External links
  
 
 Satoshi Shiki at Media Arts Database 

Living people
Year of birth missing (living people)
Manga artists